When Havoc Struck is an American documentary television series that is distributed by ITC Entertainment and ran in first-run syndication via the attempted fourth television network Mobil Showcase Network from January 11 until March 15, 1978.

Hosted by Glenn Ford, the program features stories of disasters.

Episodes
 "Camille Was No Lady"
 "SOS - Disasters at Sea"
 "The Bel-Air Fire"
  "Bridge Collapses"
 "The Great Ohio River Flood"
 "The Dust Bowl"
 "How Safe is It to Fly"
 "Volcanoes"
 "Earthquakes"
 "Life at the Limit"
 "The Children of Aberfan"
 "Disaster Airship"

See also
 Blueprint for Disaster - similar show from 2003 until 2005
 Earth's Fury - similar show from 1997 until 1998
 Disasters of the Century - similar show from 2000 until 2005
 Seconds from Disaster - similar show from 2004 until 2018

References

External links
 

1978 American television series debuts
1978 American television series endings
Documentary films about disasters
1970s American documentary television series
First-run syndicated television programs in the United States
American documentary television series
Television series by ITC Entertainment